Kate Plus Ten is a 1938 British thriller film directed by Reginald Denham and starring Jack Hulbert, Genevieve Tobin and Noel Madison. It was adapted from the Edgar Wallace novel Kate Plus Ten. It was also released as Queen of Crime.

Production
The film was an independent production shot at Shepperton Studios.

The final third of the film makes extensive use of railway locations.  Among these, the main line between Bath and Westbury (Wiltshire) was employed, with a stolen train smashing through fake level crossing gates at Freshford station.  The branch line through Limpley Stoke and Camerton was also featured, and a closed colliery in the Somerset coalfield was the location for the scene in which a steam locomotive crashes through wooden shed doors.

Plot summary
Kate, the leader of a gang of criminals, works as secretary to an aristocrat allowing her to pick up vital information. However, the police soon become suspicious of her and Scotland Yard's Inspector Pemberton is sent on her trail.

Cast
 Jack Hulbert as Inspector Mike Pemberton 
 Genevieve Tobin as Kate Westhanger 
 Noel Madison as Gregori 
 Francis L. Sullivan as Lord Flamborough 
 Arthur Wontner as Colonel Westhanger 
 Frank Cellier as Sir Ralph Sapson 
 Peter Haddon as Boltover 
 Googie Withers as Lady Moya 
 Edward Lexy as Sergeant 
 Felix Aylmer as Bishop 
 Leo Genn as Doctor Gurdon
 James Harcourt as Bank Manager 
 Vincent Holman as Detective  
 Oliver Johnston as Cunningham  
 Ronald Adam as Police Chief  
 Philip Leaver as Mulberry 
 Arthur Hambling as 3rd Signalman  
 Bryan Herbert as 2nd Signalman  
 Leonie Lamartine as Stout Woman
 Queenie Leonard 
 Walter Sondes  
 Albert Whelan
 Arthur Brander 
 Geoffrey Clark
 Paul Sheridan

Critical reception
Britmovie called it a "light-hearted comedy-thriller," adding, "like so many Wallace stories logic takes a back seat, but the speeding train sequence generates some lively thrills, and Hulbert and Tobin craft a likeable onscreen chemistry. Tobin is wickedly delightful as Kate, and Hulbert, who co-wrote the screenplay with Jeffrey Dell, gives an agreeable performance in spite of the artificiality of the role."

References

Bibliography
 Low, Rachael. Filmmaking in 1930s Britain. George Allen & Unwin, 1985.
 Wood, Linda. British Films, 1927-1939. British Film Institute, 1986.

External links

1938 films
British comedy thriller films
Films based on works by Edgar Wallace
Films directed by Reginald Denham
1930s comedy thriller films
Films set in London
Films shot in England
Films shot at Shepperton Studios
British black-and-white films
1938 comedy films
1930s English-language films
1930s British films